Más de Marco Antonio Solís (Eng.: "More of Marco Antonio Solis") is a compilation album released by Marco Antonio Solís on November 3, 2009. This album was released in two formats CD and CD with DVD.

Track listing
All songs written and composed by Marco Antonio Solís

DVD

Charts

Weekly charts

Year-end charts

References

External links
Official website
 Más de Marco Antonio Solís on Amazon.com

2009 compilation albums
Marco Antonio Solís compilation albums
Fonovisa Records compilation albums